I Am is a 2010 Indian anthology film by Onir. It consists of four short films: "Omar", "Afia", "Abhimanyu", and "Megha". Each film shares the common theme of fear, and each film is based on real-life stories. The film was financed by donations from more than 400 different people around the world, many of whom donated through social networking sites like Facebook. There are four stories but the characters are interwoven with each story. "Abhimanyu" is based on child abuse, "Omar" on gay rights, "Megha" is about Kashmiri Pandits and "Afia" deals with sperm donation. I Am was released with subtitles in all regions as six different languages are spoken in the film: Hindi, English, Kannada, Marathi, Bengali and Kashmiri.

Plot
Each film shares the common theme of fear, and each film is based on real-life stories. They are -
"Afia" - A single woman Afiaa (Nandita Das) decides to become a mother using a sperm donor. She is a web designer by profession. She had been pushing her husband Manav (Manav Kaul) for a child but Manav leaves her because he loves some other girl. She then decides to have a kid on her own, through a test tube baby. She visits a Doctor Basu's (Anurag Basu) clinic and asks the doctor to provide her more details of the Donor. She meets Suraj (Purab Kohli) and asks him few questions wherein Suraj feels awkward. Later, she goes ahead with the sperm donation and test tube baby and offers Suraj some reward as thank you gift. Suraj politely declines but hands her over his phone number. In last scene, they show a smiling Afiaa tearing the note on which Suraj's phone number was written.
"Megha" - Almost 20 years after leaving Kashmir, Kashmiri Pandit Megha (Juhi Chawla) returns home on a business trip to find her childhood Muslim friend Rubina (Manisha Koirala) has suffered too. "Megha" is inspired by Sanjay Suri's real life experiences in Kashmir.
"Abhimanyu" - Abhimanyu (Sanjay Suri), a successful director, is haunted by memories of sexual abuse as a child. He must deal with his dark memories even as he struggles with his sexual identity. "Abhimanyu" is based on the experiences of fashion designer Ganesh Nallari and gay rights activist Harish Iyer.
"Omar" - Jay Gowda, from Bangalore, (Rahul Bose) meets Omar, a struggling actor in Mumbai, (Arjun Mathur). They flirt and have dinner together and then have sex at a public place. A policeman (Abhimanyu Singh) comes and manhandles them both and threatens Jay to turn him in under Section 377 of the Indian Penal Code and blackmails into giving 100,000 Rupees as bribe. Omar goes with Jay's ATM card to draw money, meanwhile the policeman rapes Jay. Omar returns with 50,000 Rupees, which the policeman takes along with both Jay and Omar's cellphones. Then he takes Omar along with him against protests of Jay (A hint of the policeman intenting to rape Omar). Later on Jay meets Omar again in a hotel and tell him that later that night, Jay had gone and woke up a big lawyer and went with him to the police station to get Omar released only to find that Omar was never there and then he realized that Omar was a part of setup to extort money from Jay. "Omar" is inspired by stories and research material provided by the online portal Gay Bombay.

Cast

Afia 
 Nandita Das as Afiaa Kidwai
 Purab Kohli as Suraj
 Anurag Basu as Doctor Basu
 Manav Kaul as Manav in a special appearance

Megha 
 Juhi Chawla as Megha
 Manisha Koirala as Rubina
 Rushad Rana as Rubina's brother
 Madhu Sagar as Ami (Rubina's mother)
 Behram Rana as Abu (Rubina's father)
 Faisal Burza as the lawyer
 Fayeem Shah as Rubina's cousin
 Mushtaq Kak as Beig Shab (shop keeper)

Abhimanyu 
 Sanjay Suri as Abhimanyu “Abhi”
 Radhika Apte as Natasha/Nats
 Shernaz Patel as Asha (mother)
 Anurag Kashyap as Vinay (step-father)
 Pooja Gandhi as Aparna

Omar 
 Rahul Bose as Jay Gowda
 Arjun Mathur as Omar
 Abhimanyu Singh as Policeman

Production

Onir first developed an idea for a short film while in Berlin, Germany. He later decided to make four shorts as he had too many ideas to fit into only one film. "Abhinmanyu" was originally written as a full-length film starring Karisma Kapoor in her comeback, but after she pulled out Onir changed the main character to a male and turned it into a short film. The shorts were shot on location in Srinagar ("Megha"), Mumbai ("Omar"), Bangalore ("Abhimanyu") and Kolkata ("Afia"). The "Afia" segment was originally intended to explore corruption in NGOs, but Onir decided to focus on sperm donation instead. During location shooting in Srinagar for the "Megha" segment, the crew was attacked by rocks and received terror threats and had to shift to Karan Nagar. Onir returned later under the guise of a documentary filmmaker to capture additional footage.

Sponsorships through social media 
Onir raised financing from not only the film's stars, but also from members of the general public from around the world. Using Twitter and Facebook, Onir offered backers co-production credit in the film and a share in the profits. People who donated more than Rs. 100,000 became co-producers with a share in profits while those who contributed less than Rs. 100,000 received a mention in the credits. People have sent their contributions from Austria, the US, Nigeria and Australia. 
I Am is the first mainstream Hindi film that is crowd-sourced through social networking sites. Over 400 people from 45 cities across the world made this film happen by volunteering or contributing financially.

Celebrity contribution 
Many of the participants in the film worked for free; Juhi Chawla, Manisha Koirala and Anurag Kashyap did not draw salaries and Manish Malhotra designed the film's costumes for free. Fashion designers like Manish Arora and Aki Narula have made costumes available for free, while actors and his friends Juhi Chawla and Sanjay Suri, and director Anurag Kashyap have supported him with ideas. Juhi Chawla and Purab Kohli also financially contributed to the stories in the movie.

Release
I Am had its world premiere at the I View Film Festival in New York City. It screened at several other film festivals like the International Film Festival of Kerala and the Vancouver International Film Festival.  
I Am was originally scheduled for theatrical release in India and Australia on 22 April 2011, but Onir changed it to 29 April. To promote the release of the film, Onir has started a script writing contest where the authors of the 10 best scripts will win a meeting with him to pitch their screenplays. I Am will have a staggered release internationally beginning in New Zealand, and then moving to the US, Canada and Europe.

Home media
The DVD of I Am released on 31 May.

Reception

Critical response
I Am received mainly positive reviews from critics. The Times of India called it "an important and intelligent film" and The Film Street Journal named it "a must watch". Taran Adarsh gave the film three and a half stars and named it "a motion picture of major significance" and "a landmark film". Rajeev Masand praised I Am for "fine performances and its inherent honesty". Critics particularly praised Abhimanyu Singh and Nandita Das for their performances. On the other hand, Shilpa Jamkhandikar of Reuters called I Am "painfully rehearsed" and "oversimplified".

Box office
In its opening weekend I Am released on 67 screens in India and 7 in Australia, but failed to make an impact at the box office. It was fourth in overall weekend collections, ranking ahead of only Zokkomon. The Times of India blamed the poor collections on the film's depiction of social issues, saying it was "restricted only to discerning audience".

Soundtrack

The soundtrack for I Am was released on 8 April 2011 on Sony Music. The songs are composed by Amit Trivedi, Rajiv Bhalla and Vivek Phillip with lyrics by Amitabh Verma and Amitabh Bhattacharya.

Accolades
In 2012 I Am won the National Award for Best Hindi Film and Best Lyrics.

The scripts for "Abhimanyu" and "Omar" were nominated for Triangle Media Group (TMG) Global Awards. I Am also won the Audience Award at the 2010 River to River. Florence Indian Film Festival, the Best Asian Film Award at the International Film Festival of Kerala, and the I-VIEW Film Festival's Engendered Award for Human Rights.

 Triangle Media Group's David Flint Honorary Award for Promoting Human Rights The Triangle Media Group, Biennial Global Awards felicitated Sanjay Suri and Onir for their upcoming film I Am. The award was for Media for Social Justice. Onir was in Nottingham to receive the award from Lord Mayor of Nottingham Jeannie Packer and Vernon Coaker, MP Minister of State for Schools and Learners.

 Official Selection

I Am has also been opening or a closing film for the following festivals
 Opening Film London Asian Film Festival, 2011
 Closing Film Australian Indian Film Festival, 2011
 Opening Film New Zealand Indian Film Festival, 2011
 Opening The Silk Screen Film Festival, Pittsburgh (US), 2011
 Closing Film Seattle South Asian Film Festival, 2011

References

External links
 
 

2010 films
2010s Bengali-language films
2010s Hindi-language films
LGBT-related films based on actual events
Films set in India
Films shot in India
Indian LGBT-related films
Indian anthology films
Indian drama films
2010 drama films
Films set in Kolkata
Films set in Mumbai
Films about women in India
Indian pregnancy films
Best Hindi Feature Film National Film Award winners
2010 LGBT-related films
Hindi-language drama films
LGBT-related drama films